Renan Ribeiro (born 23 March 1990) is a Brazilian professional footballer who plays as a goalkeeper.

He began his career in the Campeonato Brasileiro Série A with Atlético Mineiro and São Paulo. In January 2018 he moved to Portugal, where he represented Estoril and Sporting CP in the Primeira Liga.

Club career

Early career
Born in Ribeirão Preto, São Paulo state, Ribeiro began his career in the youth team of hometown club Botafogo-SP before joining Atlético Mineiro. He made his professional debut on 26 September 2010 in a 2–1 win at Grêmio in the Campeonato Brasileiro Série A, the first match under new manager Dorival Júnior.

In June 2013, Ribeiro transferred to São Paulo FC on a five-year contract at the end of his deal with Atlético Mineiro. Signed as back-up to club icon Rogério Ceni, he did not debut until 9 April 2015, in a 3–0 home win over Portuguesa in the Campeonato Paulista.

Ribeiro played just over the majority of games for the Tricolor in the 2017 national league, when he battled for his place with the experienced Sidão under manager Dorival Júnior.

Estoril
For the January 2018 transfer window, Ribeiro moved abroad for the first time, to Estoril of Portugal's Primeira Liga until June 2020. He debuted on 15 January in a home game against Porto that was abandoned at half-time for safety issues; his side ended the season relegated in last place.

Sporting
In August 2018, Ribeiro was loaned to Sporting CP in the same league, for a fee of €250,000 and the option to make the deal permanent. He made his debut for the team from Lisbon on 7 October as a half-time substitute for the injured Romain Salin in a 4–2 loss at Portimonense.

Ribeiro surpassed Salin and Emiliano Viviano as the first-choice goalkeeper at the Estádio José Alvalade, and in January 2019 the club activated the €1 million permanent transfer clause, tying him to them until 2023. Also that month, he helped them win the Taça da Liga with penalty shootout victories over S.C. Braga (semi-final) and Porto (final); he saved three times against the former and once more from Hernâni in the latter to lift the trophy on his mother's birthday.

On 13 April 2019, Ribeiro was sent off after four minutes for a foul on Luquinhas in a 3–1 win at C.D. Aves. On 25 May he again denied Porto on penalties in the Taça de Portugal final, saving from compatriot Fernando.

Ribeiro was sent off on 12 December 2019 in the UEFA Europa League, for conceding a penalty in the 34th minute of a 3–0 loss at Austria's LASK; the result meant that Sporting finished second in their group. Having spent the second half of that season benched for youth product Luís Maximiano, he announced in April 2020 that he wanted to leave the club.

Having not played since his red card against LASK, Ribeiro was released on 20 July 2022 with one year remaining on his contract, freeing up €1.3 million in Sporting's annual wages.

Al-Ahli
On 26 July 2022, Ribeiro joined Saudi Arabian club Al-Ahli on a one-year deal following his release from Sporting CP.

Career statistics

Honours
Atlético Mineiro
Campeonato Mineiro: 2010, 2012

Sporting CP
Taça da Liga: 2018–19
Taça de Portugal: 2018–19

References

External links
CBF
Renan Ribeiro at playmakerstats.com (English version of ogol.com.br)

1990 births
Living people
People from Ribeirão Preto
Brazilian footballers
Brazil under-20 international footballers
Brazil youth international footballers
Campeonato Brasileiro Série A players
Primeira Liga players
Clube Atlético Mineiro players
São Paulo FC players
G.D. Estoril Praia players
Sporting CP footballers
Al-Ahli Saudi FC players
Brazilian expatriate footballers
Brazilian expatriate sportspeople in Portugal
Brazilian expatriate sportspeople in Saudi Arabia
Expatriate footballers in Portugal
Expatriate footballers in Saudi Arabia
Association football goalkeepers
Footballers from São Paulo (state)